Alexander Gillies (14 June 1875 – 1932) was a Scottish footballer who played in the Football League for Bolton Wanderers, Leicester Fosse, Manchester City and The Wednesday.

References

1875 births
1932 deaths
Scottish footballers
English Football League players
Association football forwards
Lochgelly United F.C. players
Bolton Wanderers F.C. players
Manchester City F.C. players
Heart of Midlothian F.C. players
Sheffield Wednesday F.C. players
Leicester City F.C. players
Dumbarton F.C. players
People from Cowdenbeath
Footballers from Fife